Christopher A. Jones (born October 14, 1969) is an American comic book artist living in Minneapolis, Minnesota. He contributes artwork for DC Comics' Young Justice (2011-2013), based on the animated TV series of the same name and written by Greg Weisman, and Marvel's Avengers: Earth's Mightiest Heroes (2012–present), based on the animated TV series of the same name and written by Christopher Yost. Christopher Jones has previously contributed art to The Batman Strikes! (2004-2008), is the co-creator of Dr. Blink Superhero Shrink and has drawn various projects for DC, Marvel, Disney, and other publishers, ranging from kids' titles such as Superhero Squad to horror titles such as Re-Animator.

References

External links
 Official Website

1969 births
Living people
American comics artists